Misri Khan Orakzai (c. 1962 – September 14, 2010), who had been a journalist for the Daily Ausaf and Daily Mashriq and was the president of the Hangu Union of Journalists, was from Khyber Pakhtunkhwa province, Pakistan and was shot and killed at the press club in Hangu by the Pakistani Taliban, or Tehrik-e Taliban, for negative coverage.

Personal  
Misri Khan Orakzai  was born in Pakistan in the year 1962. Orakzai was married with a total of six sons and five daughters.

Career  
Misri Khan Orakzai had been an Urdu-language journalist almost 30 years at the time of his murder. Early in his career, he worked for several different daily newspapers, such as Jinnah and Daily Ausaf in Islamabad and Daily Mashriq in Peshawar. Orakzai founded and ran the Misri Khan News Agency, the main news source in Hangu. Khan was president of the Hangu Union of Journalists in the Hangu district of Khyber Pakhtunkhwa.

Death 
Misri Khan Orakzai had been threatened before his murder, according to Orakzai's son Umer Farooq. Another son of his had been abducted March 1, 2009. The fatal attack on Orakzai took place September 14, 2010. One of Misri's sons said this after his father's death: "As far as we know, the incident is the result of his reporting."

Orakzai was outside of a press club of the Hangu Union of Journalists around 6:30 a.m. waiting for a delivery of newspapers. Three unidentified men shot him at least four times and one of those bullets entered his heart. He was taken to the District Headquarters Hospital in Hangu where he died. They said that he was receiving several death threats from terrorist groups because of what he had been reporting.

The terrorist group Tehreek-e-Taliban threatened Orakzai and other journalists and claimed responsibility for his murder for publishing negative stories about the Taliban. Ehsanullah Ehsan, a spokesman for the Taliban, contacted a journalist in Peshawar, the provincial capital, and said, "We killed him because he twisted the facts."

Reactions 
Irina Bokova, director-general of UNESCO, said, "I condemn the killing of Misri Khan Orakzai ... In carrying out their professional duties, they helped to uphold the basic right of freedom of expression. I call on the authorities in Pakistan to do their utmost to arrest the culprits of these crimes and bring them to justice."

President Asif Ali Zardari called Orakzai's murder a "heinous and despicable act of terrorism."

The Hangu Union of Journalists, Khyber Union of Journalists, Tribal Union of Journalists, and Pakistan Federal Union of Journalists all condemned the attack on Orakzai, demanded the authorities arrest the perpetrators, set a mourning period of three days and threatened protests if the government didn't take action. A demonstration was held to make their case.

References 

1962 births
2010 deaths
Assassinated Pakistani journalists
Deaths by firearm in Pakistan
Pakistani reporters and correspondents
People killed by the Tehrik-i-Taliban Pakistan